The 1982 United States Senate election in Virginia was held on November 2, 1982. U.S. Representative from Virginia's 1st district, Paul Trible replaced Independent Senator Harry F. Byrd Jr., who was stepping down after three terms.

Candidates

Democratic 
Dick Davis, Lieutenant Governor of Virginia

Republican 
Paul Trible, U.S. Representative

Results

See also 
 1982 United States Senate elections

References 

Virginia
1982
United States Senate